Lohani Caves are rock-cut caves and temples found near the abandoned Mandu site in southwest Madhya Pradesh, India. These excavations are dated to about the 11th and 12th century CE. The archaeological studies have yielded Hindu statues and carvings such as those of Shiva, Parvati, Vishnu and Lakshmi. These suggest that these were likely Hindu monasteries, probably belonging to the Shaivism tradition. It is near a group of Islamic monuments built after 13th century.

It is listed on the Monuments of National Importance of India with code N-MP-90.

References

Geography of Madhya Pradesh